Raymond MacLeod (June 24, 1933 – June 20, 2016) was a Canadian football player who played for the Edmonton Eskimos and Winnipeg Blue Bombers. He won the Grey Cup with the Eskimos in 1954. Born in Vancouver, he is an alumnus of the University of Oregon.

References

1933 births
2016 deaths
Canadian players of American football
Edmonton Elks players
Oregon Ducks football players
Players of Canadian football from British Columbia
Canadian football people from Vancouver
Winnipeg Blue Bombers players